Coppock is the surname of the following people:
Barclay Coppock (1839–1861), American soldier 
Chet Coppock, American radio broadcaster, television broadcaster, sports talk personality and author 
Edwin Coppock (1835–1859), American soldier, brother of Barclay
Fred Coppock (1905–1965), Australian rules footballer
Kevin Coppock (born 1932), Australian rules footballer
Richard Coppock (1885–1971), British trade unionist and politician
John Terence Coppock (1921–2000), British geographer

English-language surnames